Cheyenne County Courthouse may refer to:

Cheyenne County Courthouse (Colorado), Cheyenne Wells, Colorado
Cheyenne County Courthouse (Kansas), St. Francis, Kansas